Racinaea jenmanii is a plant species in the genus Racinaea. This species is native to Venezuela.

References

jenmanii
Flora of Venezuela